Statik Majik is an EP by British doom metal band Cathedral, released in March 1994 through Earache. "Midnight Mountain" originally appeared on the band's second full-length album, The Ethereal Mirror. Tracks 2, 3 and 4 were also released the same year on the Cosmic Requiem EP. In 2009, Statik Majik was re-released together with 1992's Soul Sacrifice EP.

Track listing

Personnel

Cathedral
 Lee Dorrian – vocals, production, mixing, sleeve concept
 Garry Jennings – guitar, bass, production, mixing
 Mark Wharton - drums
 Adam Lehan – guitar

Additional musicians
 Russell Haswell – backing vocals

Technical personnel
 Paul Johnson – production, mixing
 Dave Patchett – front cover art
 Jason Tilley – photo
 Leilah Wendell – label art
 BOO – layout

References

Cathedral (band) EPs
1994 EPs